Monahans-Wickett-Pyote Independent School District (MWPISD) is a public school district based in Monahans, Texas (USA).

In addition to Monahans, the district serves the towns of Wickett, Pyote, and Thorntonville.

In 2009, the school district was rated "academically acceptable" by the Texas Education Agency.

Schools
Monahans High School (Grades 9-12)
The mascot is the lobo.
The school newspaper is The Sandstorm, a reference to nearby Monahans Sandhills State Park, a unique geological feature and highly popular attraction.
Walker Junior High (Grades 7-8)
Sudderth Elementary (Grades 4-6)
Tatom Elementary (Grades 1-3)
Cullender Kindergarten (Grades PK-K)

Accomplishments
The high school's football team (Monahans Loboes) last state championship was a 1948 victory over New Braunfels. They also made it to the 3A semifinals in 1998. In 2005 they returned to the 3A quarter-finals but lost to the Sweetwater Mustangs.

The Big Green Band (Monahans High School's Band) were runners up in the 1998 3A UIL State Marching Contest, and later that year they also won the 1998 3A UIL State Honor Band. The band recently went back to the state marching contest in 2004, and received its 40th first division rating in 2005.

The high school's volleyball team (Monahans Lady Loboes) won the 3A State Championship in 2004 and returned to the finals in 2005, but they lost to Belville in the last game to qualify as the 2005 state runner-up. They returned to the 3A State Championship in 2007, but came up short to Wimberley in five games, making them the 2007 3A State Runner-Up.

Notable Monahans High School alumni
Natalie Zea - television actress

References

External links

Monahans-Wickett-Pyote ISD

School districts in Ward County, Texas